Sinolardoglyphus is a genus of mites in the family Acaridae.

Species
 Sinolardoglyphus nanchangensis Z. T. Jiang, 1991

References

Acaridae